These are the China national football team results and fixtures.

Best / Worst Results

Best

Worst

Results by years

1913–1949

1950–1969

1970–1989

1990–2009

2010s

2020s

See also
 China national football team head to head
 China women's national football team results and fixtures

References
Fixtures and Results on FIFA.com 
Team China Official Website 
China International Matches on RSSSF 
China Matches on Elo Ratings 
 Worldfootball.net
FIFA A-level matches